The Little Warrior is a 2021 Russian children's sports film directed by Ilya Ermolov about a boy who is fond of sumo. It was released in Russia on April 26, 2021, by Leopolis Distribution.

Plot 
The film tells about the boy Vitya Kasatkin, who finds it difficult to communicate with classmates, but he is kind and caring to his mother. Vitya is fond of sumo, the love for which he instilled
a father who now lives in Japan. Vitya has a dream - he wants to get to the youth sumo tournament, which is taking place in Japan, in order to bring his dad back to his family.

Cast

Production

Filming 
Principal photography began in 2019 and was slated to premiere in the fall of 2020. But due to the pandemic, it was postponed indefinitely. Also, due to the closure of the borders with Japan, the film crew was unable to shoot the frames that were planned according to the script of the film. An interesting fact is that a small part of the filming took place in Moscow at the sports school "Borets", where the casting of actors was also held.

Release 
The film premiered in theaters on April 26, 2021. From July 27, 2021, it is available on the  online platform.

Awards and nominations

2021: Nominated for Golden Unicorn Awards in categories of Best Emerging Talent and Best Debut

2021: SCHLINGEL International Film Festival, Mitteldeutscher Rundfunk Special Award

References

External links 
 

2021 films
2020s Russian-language films
2020s children's drama films
Russian children's drama films
2020s children's comedy films
Russian children's comedy films
2020s sports comedy-drama films
Russian sports comedy-drama films
Films shot in Moscow